Lake Burigi (originally Lueor-lo-Urigi, meaning "White Lake of Urigi") is an endorheic lake in the Karagwe district, Kagera Region of Tanzania.  Parts of the lake and its shore are situated within the Burigi Game Reserve.

History
Visited by Dr. Hans Meyer's East African expedition, its name on maps of the time was Urigi. The lake's discovery is attributed to Capt. John Hanning Speke, who name it Lueor-lo-Urigi ("White Lake of Urigi").

Geography
It is so narrow that from one side, the other can always clearly be seen. The lake's water is bright azure in color.

Fed by rivers from surrounding hills, the largest is Ruiza River. The lake is visible from Useni or Kavari. Papyrus swamps and groundwater forest areas occur around the lake. The surrounding hills are brown, with dark green bush scatterings. Its receding waters have left great extents of flat plain on the sides and around the bays running far inland into valleys. There is a narrow basin at the head of the lake. Its shore is broken by numerous inlets.

The Yanghiro district, which is situated on the eastern shore of the Urigi, is a hilly region, scattered over with villages and cultivated fields, as well as with woods of banana-trees.

The study area received an average rainfall of 964.36 mm per year, the highest peak recorded in 1951. The trend of rainfall showed that many years had rainfall below the average while the temperature was found to increase from year to year, the situation which suggests the existence of climate change in the study area.

Flora and fauna
Its shores and waters are favored by birds, such as cranes, herons, pelicans, African jacanas, egrets and waders, which find excellent feeding over the large spaces near the extremities and shore line of bays.  These are covered with close-packed growths of Pistia stratiotes rigl plants. Kobus ellipsiprymnus and Hippopotamus amphibius frequent the area. There are armies of black mosquitoes. Lake fish were infested with guinea worm at the time of Stanley's expedition.

References

Burigi
Geography of Kagera Region